Podgora is a settlement in the Municipality of Straža in southeastern Slovenia. The municipality is included in the Southeast Slovenia Statistical Region. The entire area is part of the historical region of Lower Carniola.

References

External links
Podgora at Geopedia

Populated places in the Municipality of Straža